Bhuepndra Nath Halder is an Indian politician from West Bengal and a member of the West Bengal Legislative Assembly. Halder won the Maldaha (Vidhan Sabha constituency) on the INC ticket in the 2016 West Bengal Legislative Assembly election.

References

West Bengal MLAs 2011–2016
Indian National Congress
Living people
Year of birth missing (living people)